Guatteria pastazae is a species of flowering plant in the family Annonaceae. It is endemic to Ecuador. It is known from only one location in Amazonian forest habitat.

References

External links
Guatteria pastazae. Tropicos.

pastazae
Endemic flora of Ecuador
Endangered plants
Endangered biota of South America
Taxonomy articles created by Polbot